Feeding the Gods is the sixth solo album by New Zealand singer/songwriter Tim Finn, released in June 2001. The album peaked at number 27 in New Zealand.

Track listing

Personnel
 Tim Finn - lead vocals, lead guitar
 Jay Joyce - guitars
 John Walsh - guitar technician
 Matt Eccles - drums
 Mareea Paterson - bass
 Don McGlashan -  euphonium
 Kirsten Morelle - vocals
 Geoffrey Maddock - vocals
 Janey Dunn - facts & figures

Charts

Notes 

Tim Finn albums
2001 albums
Albums produced by Jay Joyce